LN Andromedae (LN And), also known as HD 217811, HR 8768, is a formerly suspected variable star in the constellation Andromeda. Its spectral classification is B2V, meaning that it's a hot main sequence star, emitting light approximately with a blackbody spectrum at an effective temperature of 18,090 K.

Companion
In the Washington Double Star Catalog LN And has a faint optical companion star with an apparent magnitude of 9.88,  from LN And.  The separation has increased from  when it was discovered as a double in 1828.  The two stars share the same Hipparcos identifier HIP 113802, and have very similar parallaxes and proper motions.

Variability
In 1979, the blue magnitude of LN And was reported to vary by about 0.025 every 28 minutes.  Such variability was not known for any class of variable, but the position in the Hertzsprung–Russell diagram at the main sequence (low luminosity) end of the same instability strip as the β Cephei stars would make high-overtone radial pulsations the likely cause.  LN And was added to the General Catalogue of Variable Stars as LN Andromedae, but follow-up studies failed to find the same rapid variations, or any significant variations in brightness and it is now listed as probably constant.

The statistical threshold for these variations is at a level which is only met by 0.01% of stars.

References

Andromeda (constellation)
217811
Andromedae, LN
B-type main-sequence stars
8768
113802
Durchmusterung objects
Slowly pulsating B stars
Suspected variables
A-type main-sequence stars